This is a list of Ireland Test cricketers. Ireland were granted full membership and therefore Test status at the International Cricket Council's annual conference held on 22 June 2017, after having been one of the leading associate members for many years. Ireland played their first Test match in May 2018 against Pakistan at the Malahide Cricket Club Ground in Dublin.

A Test match is an international cricket match between two representative teams that are full members of the ICC. Both teams have two innings, and the match lasts up to five days.

The list is arranged in the order in which each player won his first Test cap. Where more than one player won his first Test cap in the same match, those players are listed alphabetically by surname.

Key

Players
Statistics are correct as of 26 July 2019.

See also 
 Ireland cricket team
 List of Ireland ODI cricketers
 List of Ireland Twenty20 International cricketers

Notes

References 

Ireland

Lists of Irish cricketers